CHSI may refer to:

 Comcast, an American multinational mass media company
 Harvard Collection of Historical Scientific Instruments, a collection at Harvard University